The New Jersey Folklore Society is an academic organization that formed in an attempt to spread awareness about folklore. The group took trips throughout New Jersey and produced a yearly publication.

Description 
The New Jersey Folklore Society is a social group that was formally organized in May 1945 at the behest of the New Jersey Council at Rutgers University. During their first few months of operation, they were able to gain affiliation and become a chapter of the American Folklore Society, a larger and more recognized group. It also met monthly in various locations across the state, and went on to produce a yearly publication highlighting New Jersey myths and legends. The organization drafted a constitution and elected leaders, the first being Henry Charlton Beck. Beck was a minister and scholar who became ordained during the time he led the group at Rutgers University Press. He was an editor for the Camden Courier-Post and writer for the Newark Star-Ledger. At its peak, the organization had roughly fifty members. Beck headed the society until it went dormant and disbanded in 1950. It did not re-emerge and return to activity until the 1980s.

Publications 
The society gained exposure due to its publications, which include collections of old songs and ballads from towns surrounding the Ramapo Mountains and other topics. After the re-emergence of the club in the 1980s, they focused on producing bigger articles and pamphlets that covered a larger range of topics. These articles, which were all titled New Jersey Folklife, were presented to the New Jersey Folk Festival each year until 1991.

References

General references 
"Folklore News." The Journal of American Folklore, vol. 59, no. 231, 1946, pp. 72–73.
"Folklore News." The Journal of American Folklore, vol. 63, no. 250, 1950, pp. 470–471.

External links 
 http://socialarchive.iath.virginia.edu/ark:/99166/w6rc2xdr
 https://babel.hathitrust.org/cgi/pt?id=pst.000065368985;view=1up;seq=5
 https://babel.hathitrust.org/cgi/pt?id=inu.30000108624408;view=1up;seq=6
 https://books.google.com/books?id=a2ahXkwF2O8C&pg=PA338#v=onepage&q&f=false
 http://www.njfolkfest.org/about-us/
 http://discover.hsp.org/Record/marc-239487
 http://www.afsnet.org/?page=USPubFolklore
 https://www.jstor.org/stable/1495589?seq=1#page_scan_tab_contents

New Jersey folklore
American folklore
Folklore studies